Jersey, as a polity dominated by independents, has always had a number of local pressure groups. Many ad hoc lobby groups form in response to a single issue and then dissolve once the concerns have been dealt with. However, there are a number of pressure groups actively working to influence government decisions on a number of issues.

List of Jersey pressure groups

Interest groups
The following groups are funded by their members.
Time4Change (political pressure group campaigning for social, judicial and legislative reform)
Royal Jersey Agricultural and Horticultural Society
Institute of Directors, Jersey branch
Jersey Chamber of Commerce 
Progress Jersey 
Jersey Youth Reform Team
Jersey Rights Association
Jersey Human Rights Group
Same Difference
Jersey Hospitality Association
Jersey Lodging House Association
Save Jersey's Heritage 
Société Jersiaise
Alliance Francaise, Jersey branch

Quangos
The following groups are, at least partially, funded by government. Appointments are made by the States of Jersey.
Jersey Finance
Community Relations Trust
Jersey Overseas Aid
Jersey Consumer Council
Jersey Legal Information Board

External links

Politics of Jersey